The Institute of Education (IOE), is one of the largest private secondary schools in Ireland, teaching 4th, 5th and 6th year pupils. As well as preparing for the Leaving Certificate, fourth year pupils at the Institute have the option to study a selection of subjects from the Cambridge International GCSE programme (IGCSE) as well as CEFR Language exams.

Academic offering
A Senior Cycle-only school, the Institute provides several programmes. Those who wish to study full-time at the school are known as day students and pay standard yearly fees. Students may also attend the school's part-time and evening "grind" classes, which take place in the evenings and Saturday mornings, with intensive tuition, and fees based on the number of subjects taken. Intensive five-day revision courses are also available during normal school holidays at Christmas, Easter, winter mid-term break, in May and August. Study skills seminars available in September. The institute also runs preparation courses for the Health Professions Admissions Test (HPAT).

The Institute of Education is an official exam centre for Irish Leaving Certificate and BioMedical Admissions Test.

Self-financing
Unlike other secondary schools in the country, the Institute receives no government funding and is therefore not subject to the school rules and regulations put in place by the Department of Education.

Buildings and facilities
The school is located in a number of refurbished Georgian, terraced houses on Leeson Street in Dublin. It also has three newer buildings at the back of the terraced houses. The institute has a science laboratory, art room, home economics kitchen, computer laboratory, and a specialised technical drawing classroom. There are two halls for supervised study. There are also on-site cafe facilities serving a selection of warm and cold food and beverages.

Academic performance
The institute is a grind school due to its focus on exam results, and is the single biggest provider of students to third level colleges and universities in Ireland.

Media
Between 2008 and 2012 the Institute of Education contributed to Exam Brief by the Irish Independent, a yearly six-part supplement dedicated to preparation for Leaving and Junior Certificate exams. This supplement is published in February, March and April each year.

Notable alumni

 Stephen Byrne - (RTÉ) presenter
 Katy French - socialite, model, writer, television personality and charity worker
 Jedward - entertainers
 Evanna Lynch - actress
 Paul Murphy - Teachta Dála for Solidarity

External links

References

Private schools in the Republic of Ireland
Grind schools in Ireland
Educational institutions established in 1969
Secondary schools in Dublin (city)
Buildings and structures in Dublin (city)
1969 establishments in Ireland